Chen Feifei (born 15 March 1997) is a Chinese professional racing cyclist. She rode in the women's team sprint event at the 2020 UCI Track Cycling World Championships in Berlin, Germany, winning the bronze medal with Zhong Tianshi.

References

1997 births
Living people
Chinese female cyclists
Place of birth missing (living people)
21st-century Chinese women